Aleh Uladzimiravich Veratsila (sometimes transliterated Oleg Veretilo, born 10 July 1988) is a Belarus international footballer who plays for Vitebsk.

Career
On 12 October 2010, Veratsila scored the winning third goal in extra time against Italy U21 to help the Belarus U21 team qualify for the 2011 UEFA European Under-21 Football Championship.
On 7 October 2011, Veratsila made his debut for the senior side of his country after coming on as a last-minute substitute in UEFA Euro 2012 qualifier against Romania.

He was part of the Belarus Olympic side that participated in the 2012 Toulon Tournament.

Honours
Dinamo Brest
Belarusian Premier League champion: 2019
Belarusian Cup winner: 2017–18
Belarusian Super Cup winner: 2018, 2019, 2020

References

External links
 
 
 
 
 

1987 births
Living people
People from Vawkavysk District
Sportspeople from Grodno Region
Belarusian footballers
Association football defenders
Belarus international footballers
Belarusian expatriate footballers
Expatriate footballers in Poland
Expatriate footballers in Latvia
Ekstraklasa players
FC Dinamo Minsk players
Podbeskidzie Bielsko-Biała players
FC Minsk players
FC Dynamo Brest players
FK Liepāja players
FC Vitebsk players